Luca Tribondeau (born 3 August 1996) is an Austrian freestyle skier. He was born in Wolfsberg. 
He competed in slopestyle at the FIS Freestyle World Ski Championships 2013. He competed at the 2014 Winter Olympics in Sochi, in slopestyle.

References

External links

1996 births
Living people
Freestyle skiers at the 2014 Winter Olympics
Austrian male freestyle skiers
Olympic freestyle skiers of Austria